
Huaytunas Lake is a lake in the Yacuma Province, Beni Department, Bolivia. At an elevation of 146 m, its surface area is 329.5 km².

Lakes of Beni Department